New Breed (stylized in all lowercase) is the fifth studio album by American singer-songwriter Dawn Richard. It was released on January 25, 2019 through Local Action Records.

Track listing
Credits adapted from Bandcamp.

 All track titles are stylized in all lowercase.

References

2019 albums
Albums produced by Cole M. Greif-Neill
Albums produced by Hudson Mohawke
Dawn Richard (singer) albums